Just in Time may refer to:

Music
"Just in Time" (song) a 1956 song written by Jule Styne, lyrics by Betty Comden and Adolph Green from the musical Bells Are Ringing
Just in Time (album), a 1989 album by Larry Willis, featuring the above song
Just In Time: The Final Recording, a 2019 posthumously released album by Buddy Rich
Just in Time, an 1988 album by Maura O'Connell

Film and television
 Just in Time (film), a 1997 American film directed by Shawn Levy
 "Just in Time" (Code Lyoko), an episode of the French animated television series Code Lyoko
 Just in Time (TV series), a 1988 American series starring Tim Matheson
 Just in Time, a 2006 film starring Tiffany Mulheron

Other uses
 Just-in-time manufacturing, a production strategy 
 Just-in-time compilation, a method to improve the runtime performance of computer programs
Just-in-time learning, a method to connect the learner and the content at the moment the need is recognized
 Just-in-time teaching, a strategy to improve learning outcomes

See also
 Justin Time (disambiguation)
 Nick of Time (disambiguation)